Best Day is the fifth studio album by Canadian band Dala. It was released on May 29, 2012 in the US and June 5, 2012 in Canada.

Reception
Best Day was released to critical acclaim.  It earned three Canadian Folk Music Award nominations for English Songwriter of the Year, Vocal Group of the Year, and Producer of the Year, and was listed at #24 on Muruch's Top 25 Albums of 2012

Track listing

Personnel
 Sheila Carabine – vocals, acoustic guitars, ukulele, piano
 Amanda Walther – vocals, acoustic guitars, piano
 Mike Roth – producer
 Dan Roth – bass (track 1, 11), electric guitar (track 11)
 Gary Craig – drums (track 1, 6, 8)
 Doug Cameron – steel guitar (track 1,8), banjo track 1), mandolin (track 1, 8)
 Chris Bilton – string arrangement (track 1, 6), piano (track 1, 3), keyboards(track 1, 3, 6)
 Kevin Fox – cello (track 2, 4, 5, 7)
 Asher Lenz – string arrangement and keyboards (track 2)
 Vince Gassi – trumpet (track 4)
 Adrian Walther – bass (track 6, 8, 10)
 Adrian Vanelli – drums (track 10)

Use in media
Good as Gold is featured in the Canadian science fiction television series Continuum episode 2.3, Second Thoughts.

References

External links

2012 albums
Dala (band) albums